Walk the Walk is a 1970 exploitation film.

Walk the Walk may also refer to:

"Walk the Walk", a song by Face to Face from Face to Face
"Walk the Walk", a song by Poe from Haunted
"Walk the Walk", a song by Special Ed from Revelations
Walk the Walk, a charity founded by Nina Barough

See also
Walk the Walk...Talk the Talk, a 2011 album by the Head Cat
Talk the Talk, a 2014 album by the Angels